scienceindustries is a business association of more than 250 chemical, pharmaceutical, biotech other science-based companies in Switzerland. It is a major member of economiesuisse, the umbrella organization of the Swiss economy.

External links

References

Business organisations based in Switzerland